This article lists candidates for the 2019 Thai prime minister. There were 69 candidates in total (45 parties).

Bhumjaithai Party

Chart Pattana Party

Chartthaipattana Party

Commoner Party of Thailand

Democrat Party

Foundational Party

Future Forward Party

Green Party

Kasikornthai Party

Klong Thai Party

Moderate Party

New Alternative Party

New Aspiration Party

Phalang Pracharat Party

Pheu Thai Party

Prachachart Party

Siam Development Party

Thai Citizen Power Party

Thai Citizens' Party

Thai Civilized Party

Thai Ethnic Party

Thai Liberal Party

Thai Moderate Party

Thai Morality Party

Thai Social Democratic Party

Thai Teachers for People Party

Thai Workers Party

References 

2019 in Thailand
Thailand
2019 in Thai politics